Raj Nartaki is a 1941 Indian Hindi-language film directed by Modhu Bose under the Wadia Movietone banner. It starred the famous dancer Sadhana Bose (written as Sadhona in the title) with Prithviraj Kapoor, Jal Khambata, Nayampalli and Protima Das Gupta. It was made simultaneously in English, Bengali and Hindi. The film was distributed in Europe and US through Columbia in Hollywood. It managed to recover its cost with the virtue of being released in three languages. Raj Nartaki established J. B. H Wadia's reputation as an intellectual film maker. The story is set in the early 19th century in the Manipur Kingdom and is about social barriers and a court dancer.

Cast
 Sadhona Bose as Indrani the Court Dancer
 Protimadas Gupta as Riya, 1st Companion
 Benita Gupta as Priya, 2nd Companion
 Prithviraj as Prince Chandrakirti
 Jal Khambata as High Priest Kashishwar
 Nayampalli as King Jaisingh 
 Thapan as Captain of the Guards
 Simeons as Hermit Khaipa
 Prabhat Sinha as Envoy Bhadrapal

References

External links
 
 Raj Nartaki on indiancine.ma
 Full movie on YouTube

1940 films
1940s Hindi-language films
Indian multilingual films
Indian drama films
1940 drama films
Indian black-and-white films
1941 drama films
1941 films
1940s multilingual films
Hindi-language drama films
Meitei royalty
Meitei culture
Meitei folklore in popular culture
Cultural depictions of Indian monarchs
Indian historical drama films
History of India on film
History of Manipur
Films about courtesans in India
Films scored by Timir Baran